Arthur Brayley Reynolds (born 30 May 1935) is a Welsh former professional footballer.

Club career

Born in Blackwood, Reynolds began his career playing for Lovell's Athletic, where his performances persuaded Cardiff City to sign him for a fee of £2,500. After impressing in the club's reserve side, he was handed his Football League debut in October 1956 during a 4–1 defeat to Leeds United. He went on to make over 50 appearances for the side but was unable to establish himself as a first team regular due to a series of injuries. In May 1959 he left to join South Wales rivals Swansea Town for £6,000, scoring 16 goals in all competitions during his first season at the Vetch Field.

During the 1961–62 season, Reynolds scored his highest goal tally in a season with 18 in all competitions and finished as the club's top scorer for a second time two years later, during the 1963–64 season. He spent 6 years at the club before moving into non-league football in 1965.

After football

After retiring from football, Reynolds later worked at the Penallta Colliery, near Hengoed.

Reynolds was also a keen cricketer and played for Blackwood Town for many years, captaining the team's 2nd XI in 1980.

References

1935 births
Living people
Welsh footballers
Cardiff City F.C. players
Swansea City A.F.C. players
English Football League players
People from Blackwood, Caerphilly
Sportspeople from Caerphilly County Borough
Lovell's Athletic F.C. players
Association football forwards